Territorial Assembly elections were held in Guinea on 31 March 1957. The result was a victory for the Democratic Party of Guinea – African Democratic Rally, which won 56 of the 60 seats in the Assembly. Voter turnout was 60.3%.

Results

References

Elections in Guinea
Guinea
1957 in Guinea